Comarostaphylis arbutoides is a species of shrub in the heath family. Its range extends from central Mexico south to Guatemala, Honduras, Nicaragua, Costa Rica, and western Panama. There are two subspecies: arbutoides, distinguished by the presence of a rust-colored tomentum on the leaf underside, and costaricensis which lacks the tomentum.

References

Arbutoideae
Flora of Central America
Flora of Mexico
Plants described in 1843
Cloud forest flora of Mexico
Flora of the Talamancan montane forests